Events in the year 1940 in Bolivia.

Incumbents
President: Carlos Quintanilla (Interim president) (until 15 April), Enrique Peñaranda (starting 15 April)

Events

 10 March – General elections are held. Enrique Peñaranda (I-CONC) wins by 85.99%
 15 April – Enrique Peñaranda is sworn in as the 38th President of Bolivia.
 26 July – Revolutionary Left Party (PIR) is founded in Oruro.

Births

Deaths

References

 
1940s in Bolivia